The 28th People's Choice Awards, honoring the best in American popular culture for 2001, were held on January 13, 2002 at the Shrine Auditorium in Los Angeles, California. They were hosted by Kevin James, and broadcast on CBS.

Awards
Winners are listed first, in bold.

External links
2002 People's Choice.com

People's Choice Awards
2001 awards in the United States
2002 in Los Angeles
January 2002 events in the United States